Blues Roots is a studio album by musician Ike Turner. The album was released on United Artists Records in June 1972.

Recording and release 
Blues Roots was a side project recorded in 1971 and 1972 at Turner's studio, Bolic Sound, in Inglewood, California. Two singles were released, "Right On" and a cover of Lloyd Price's "Lawdy Miss Clawdy."

Critical reception 

Billboard (June 10, 1972): The strength of Ike's style does lie in his "Blues Roots." Producing himself on this package of blues images, including some material of blues great Willie Dixon and other masters, Ike proves his ability as a writer and artist of the blues as well as his development as a singIe performer. No horns, no Ikettes, no frills – just clean, pure blues from the roots.

Reissues 
Blues Roots was reissued by BGO Records in 2012 on the compilation CD Blues Roots/Bad Dreams.

Track listing

Personnel
Ike Turner - vocals, guitar, arrangements
Technical
Barry Keene, John Mills, Jim Saunders, Steve Waldman - engineer
Mike Salisbury - design
Norman Seeff - art direction, photography

References 

1972 albums
Albums produced by Ike Turner
Ike Turner albums
United Artists Records albums
Albums produced by Gerhard Augustin
Albums recorded at Bolic Sound